The Immediate Geographic Region of Além Paraíba is one of the 10 immediate geographic regions in the Intermediate Geographic Region of Juiz de Fora, one of the 70 immediate geographic regions in the Brazilian state of Minas Gerais and one of the 509 of Brazil, created by the National Institute of Geography and Statistics (IBGE) in 2017.

Municipalities 
It comprises 5 municipalities.

 Além Paraíba    
 Estrela Dalva     
 Pirapetinga      
 Santo Antônio do Aventureiro      
 Volta Grande

References 

Geography of Minas Gerais